The Favorite  is a two-part film based on the 1962 detective novel of British writer Dick Francis, Dead Cert. For the first time the Soviet Central Television was demonstrated on 13 and 14 September 1977.

Plot
After the death of Bill Davidson at the races, his friend  the jockey Alan York (Arnis Licitis) learns that this was not an accident. Attempts to establish a murder client lead him to the disclosure of a whole criminal group, headed by a person close to him.

He gradually penetrates deep into intrigue, connected not only with the jumps on which Bill died, but also with a local gang of taxi drivers. Not only love and the desire for the hostess of the new racehorse, Kate, which Alan must ride, but also the debt to Bill's wife, forces him to ask the same questions over and over again.

Cast
 Arnis Līcītis as Alan York
 Ints Burans as Colonel William Davidson
Ion Ungureanu as Inspector Lodge
Romualdas Ramanauskas as Dan Hillman
Mara Zwaigzne as Cat
Gediminas Karka as Uncle George Edgar Penn
Elza Radziņa as Auntie Debb Penn
Jonas Vaitecaitis as Sandy Mason
 Vadim Vilsky as  Tomkins
 Afanasi Trishkin as bandit

Soundtrack 
The film actively uses the music of John Lennon from the album Imagine.

References

External links
 

Soviet crime drama films
1976 films
Soviet horse racing films
1970s crime drama films
Soviet television films
Films based on British novels
1976 drama films